The Betrayal of the American Right is a book by Murray Rothbard written in the early 1970s and published by the Ludwig von Mises Institute in 2007.

In it, Rothbard describes the development of the American political Old Right between the 1930s and 1950s, claiming that it died out in favor of a more interventionist political Right during the Cold War. It also describes Rothbard's own intellectual development during the period.

Summary 
Rothbard describes the transformation of the American right wing over the past two decades, from an opposition movement to an establishment-supporting one. As defined in Chapter 1, "Two Rights, Old and New", the Old Right, which existed from the mid-1930s to the mid-1950s, was a libertarian, anti-establishment movement that opposed the New Deal and American global intervention abroad; the New Right, which emerged in the 1960s, embraced the establishment and its power, becoming more statist and traditional conservative in its political philosophy. Rothbard emphasizes the irony of the fact that the term "Establishment," now used as a term of opprobrium by the Left, was first applied to America by Frank S. Meyer in the National Review, a right-wing publication, as a term of bitter criticism of the establishment by the Old Right.

Chapters about the "Origins of the Old Right" 
Chapter 2, "Origins of the Old Right I: Early Individualism", argues that the Old Right's roots lay in the individualist and laissez-faire liberalism of the American Revolution, which sought to free individuals from feudal and mercantilist orders. The movement was initially made up of individuals like Edward Atkinson, a New England businessman, and sociologist William Graham Sumner, who opposed the US's imperialism and the Spanish-American War. Rothbard argues that opposition to imperialism and war was not exclusive to the Left, as the tradition of anti-war movements went back to classical liberalism. However, the opposition to World War I was mainly led by the Socialist Party as the older generation of laissez-faire leaders died. The hardcore antiwar leaders included individualists such as Senator Robert LaFollette, Charles A. Lindbergh, and Albert Jay Nock, who later served as leaders of libertarian thought in America. The World War I experience traumatized the individuals and groups opposed to the conflict, which led to the emergence of a conservative Old Right movement in the late 1930s.

Chapter 3, "Origins of the Old Right II: The Tory Anarchism of Mencken and Nock", continues to describe the intellectual roots of the "Old Right" movement in America. The chapter focuses on two influential figures of the 1920s, H.L. Mencken and Albert Jay Nock. Mencken, an individualist and libertarian, founded the American Mercury, a monthly publication that opposed censorship, championed civil liberties, and called for unrestricted freedom of the individual. Nock, a laissez-faire individualist, co-founded and co-edited the Freeman, a weekly publication that welcomed all left-oppositionists to the political order. Nock considered the State to be an antisocial institution rather than a liberal instrument of social reform. Both Mencken and Nock denounced the American and Allied intervention in the Russian Civil War, and the post-war settlement imposed at Versailles.

Rothbard discusses H.L. Mencken's libertarian views, including his belief that all government is evil and that capitalism is the best system. However, Mencken also criticized big business for its role in promoting statism in America. He pointed out that lawyers, who were responsible for many useless and vicious laws, dominated the government, and that John W. Davis, the Democratic candidate, was a lawyer whose life was devoted to protecting the interests of big business. Mencken also provided a brief analysis of the postwar settlement and how the Morgans and their allies used their influence to get Uncle Sam under the English hoof to protect their English and other foreign investments.

Then, he discusses the Nock-Oppenheimer class analysis and its differences with Marx's. While they both agree on the existence of ruling classes in pre-capitalistic eras, Nock argues that antagonistic classes can only be created by the use of the State instrument, whereas Marx believes that businessmen and workers are in class antagonism even in a free-market economy. Nock distinguishes between "State power," the coercive and parasitic expropriation of social power for the benefit of the rulers, and "social power," the power over nature exerted by free men in voluntary economic and social relationships. Nock sees society's progress as an eternal race between social power and State power. The author also quotes Nock's criticism of big business's role in the twentieth century's onrush toward statism and how they wanted a government they could use instead of one that would let business alone.

Chapters dealing with the New Deal and the late 1930s 
Chapter 4, "The New Deal and the Emergence of the Old Right", discusses the change in the position of individualists and libertarians from the left to the right after the emergence of the New Deal in the US. The individualists and libertarians were initially opposed to the emergence of Big Government, imperialism, and foreign wars in the country. However, they perceived the New Deal as fascism come to America, with a burgeoning corporate state run by Big Business and Big Unions as its junior partner. They were stunned by the embrace of the New Deal by the Left and their former allies, the socialists and progressives. The younger generation of intellectuals, who had been followers of Mencken and Villard, also abandoned their individualism to join the "working class" and become planners of the new Utopia. The chapter also discusses how the Big Business collectivist plans of Swope Plan, adopted by most big business groups, became a part of the NRA and AAA. The individualists and laissez-faire liberals were embittered by the mass desertion of their former allies and the abuse they now heaped upon them as "reactionaries," "fascists," and "Neanderthals."

Rothbard discusses the views of Albert Jay Nock and Garet Garrett regarding education and the New Deal. Nock argued that the problem with modern education was not with vocational courses per se, but with the accelerating commitment to mass education, which brought the majority of ineducable youth into schools and forced them into jobs and occupations for which they were not suited. Meanwhile, Garrett claimed that the New Deal was a systematic revolution that increased executive power over the social and economic life of the nation. To the New Deal, preserving the "American system of free private enterprise" stood for a conquered province, and the ultimate power of initiative had passed from private enterprise to government.

Chapter 5, "Isolationism and the Foreign New Deal", describes how the isolationism movement shifted from a Left phenomenon in the 1920s to a Right phenomenon in the late 1930s. During World War I and the 1920s, the conservatives were the proponents of American war and expansion, while the opposition to American wars and foreign intervention was considered liberal or radical. However, in the late 1930s, the Roosevelt administration moved towards war, and the majority of liberals and the Left "flip-flopped" drastically in favor of war and foreign intervention. The erstwhile friends and allies who continued to persist in their old beliefs were now castigated and denounced as reactionaries, fascists, anti-Semites, and followers of the Goebbels line. The Communist Party and its allies also joined in the smear campaign. The pressure on the liberals and progressives who continued to oppose the coming war was intense, and many personal tragedies resulted. Many people who held fast to their principles, such as Charles A. Beard, Harry Elmer Barnes, John T. Flynn, and Oswald Garrison Villard, were purged from their ranks of liberal journalism.

Rothbard discusses the ideological spectrum and the meaning of Left and Right in American politics. According to Rothbard, the New Deal's drive toward war reshuffled these concepts, and left and liberal opponents of war were hounded out of the media and journals of opinion by their erstwhile allies and condemned as reactionaries and Neanderthals. The pressure exerted by the Left-liberal Establishment resulted in the forging of the "old Right." The venom directed against the opponents of war was almost unbelievable, and responsible publicists regularly and systematically accused the isolationists of being "fascists" and members of a "Nazi transmission belt." The oppression of the isolationists was not confined to vilification or loss of employment. In numerous cities, the America First Committee found it difficult or impossible to obtain halls for public meetings. Another tactic used systematically before, during, and immediately after the war was private espionage against the Old Right by interventionist groups.

Rothbard discusses the views of the Old Right in the lead-up to World War II. They predicted that America would become a totalitarian collectivist state with suppression of civil liberties and global imperialism, as a result of the war. Rothbard quotes extensively from John T. Flynn's book As We Go Marching, which argued that the New Deal and wartime society were the American version of fascism, establishing a corporate state that big business had been seeking since the end of the 19th century, and that the New Deal's NRA and AAA were modeled on the fascist corporate state, and the war re-established this collectivist program. Flynn predicted that the federal government would maintain vast spending and controls after the war, with the great emphasis on military spending, which conservatives would never object to, and which workers would welcome for job creation; that conscription would be continued on a permanent basis, and the country would be asked if it seriously wished to demobilize an industry that could employ so many men, creating so much national income when the nation faced the probability of vast unemployment in industry; that the US's involvement in militarism and imperialism would result in a fascist government. Flynn had argued that interventionism and imperialism were disguised as "internationalism" and that imperialism would lead to perpetual "enemies", and predicted further that fascism would come at the hands of Americans who believed the economic system had failed and wanted to commit the country to a bureaucratic state. Flynn warns against this new order, stating that it will be a form of fascism, virtuous and polite, that masquerades as a champion of democracy.

Chapters dealing with World War II and the postwar period 
Chapter 6, "World War II: The Nadir", claims that the advent of World War II brought the Old Right to its darkest days. The libertarians and isolationists were harassed, reviled, and persecuted. The intellectuals and agitators of the Old Right were deprived of a voice, and there was no room for libertarian or anti-war views amidst the monolith of wartime propaganda. In contrast, the Old Left experienced a glorious age, as liberal ideals of central planning and a new planned order staffed by Brain Trusters and liberal intellectuals seemed to be the wave of the future. Everywhere, "any conservative views seemed as dead and outmoded as the dodo." The Communists were in the forefront of the new patriotism, both foreign and domestic, and played a subordinate role in the war effort. They advocated a permanent no-strike pledge even after the war and took the lead in advocating it. An eloquent cry against this wartime atmosphere arose in a "brilliant" anti-New Deal novel, The Grand Design, published after the war by John Dos Passos, "a lifelong radical and individualist who had been pushed from 'extreme Left' to 'extreme Right' by the march of war and corporate statism in America".

The chapter discusses the works of four important libertarian authors during World War II. The first was Rose Wilder Lane, who wrote The Discovery of Freedom in celebration of the history of freedom and free-market capitalism. Isabel Paterson's The God of the Machine was a collection of essays with a brilliant critique of welfarism and progressive education. Albert Nock's Memoirs of a Superfluous Man was an intellectual autobiography with themes of history, theory, culture, and the state. Lastly, Ludwig von Mises had published a giant laissez-faire treatise on economics in Geneva in 1940, a book which got lost amidst the twin storms of the march of communism and Keynesianism.

Chapter 7, "The Postwar Renaissance I: Libertarianism", discusses the ideological climate after World War II. Rothbard talks about his time at Columbia Graduate School in 1945–46, where the atmosphere was filled with internationalism, statism, and economic planning. The newly formed American Veterans Committee was split between Social Democrats and Communists. It was during this time that the author learned about a libertarian movement through a young economics professor, George J. Stigler. Stigler recommended a pamphlet jointly written by himself and Milton Friedman, called Roofs or Ceilings? published by the Foundation for Economic Education (FEE). FEE was founded in 1946 by Leonard E. Read and served as a major focus for libertarian activity in the United States, attracting many young libertarians into the movement. FEE's earliest staff included free-market agricultural economists led by Dr. F.A. Harper. Other important figures in the early postwar libertarian movement included Loren ("Red") Miller, William Volker, and his nephew, Harold W. Luhnow. After Volker's death, Luhnow changed the orientation of the Volker Fund to promote libertarian and laissez-faire scholarship.

Rothbard discusses Frank Chodorov's views on free enterprise and anti-socialist groups. Chodorov believes that these groups are more concerned with the institution of privilege rather than private property. He argues that if they truly favored freedom, they would call for the abolition of various government interventions, including tariffs, import quotas, subsidies, and taxes. Additionally, Chodorov criticizes these groups for supporting militarism, which he considers to be the greatest threat to individual freedom. Rothbard credits Chodorov with introducing him to libertarian thinkers like Albert Jay Nock, Garet Garrett, and H.L. Mencken. Rothbard also describes his conversion to Austrian economics and individualist anarchism in the winter of 1949–50. He discovered Ludwig von Mises' teachings at a seminar and became a dedicated "Austrian" and Misesian after reading Mises' book Human Action.

Rothbard explains his conversion to anarchism as a logical extension of his belief in laissez-faire economics. His libertarianism had always been driven by a moral objection to coercion and aggression, and while he believed that the free market was more efficient than statism, his major concern was always ethical. After a discussion with liberal friends, he realized that his belief in a laissez-faire government was logically untenable because it relied on a vague "social contract" basis that conflicted with the insights of other thinkers on the nature of the State. He concluded that an individual's disposal or use of his own property was the only genuine contract. As a result, he became an individualist and free-market anarchist and began to devour all the individualist anarchist literature he could find. He was particularly enchanted by Benjamin R. Tucker's Liberty and Lysander Spooner's Letter to Grover Cleveland, which he considered to be one of the greatest demolitions of statism ever written. He was especially struck by Spooner's No Treason, which confirmed his hatred of the State and convinced him that taxation was tantamount to robbery.

Rothbard discusses the rise and fall of anarchism in the Foundation for Economic Education (FEE). The author explains that the idea of anarchism was brewing in the libertarian movement in those days, and many staff members at FEE, including Ellis Lamborn, were openly calling themselves anarchists. However, Leonard Read's booklet Government—An Ideal Concept sent shockwaves through libertarian circles, as it moved Read back into the pro-government camp and liquidated FEE's tradition of consistent opposition to illegitimate government action. Numerous letters and lengthy manuscripts poured into FEE in protest from anarchist friends across the country, but Read was unheeding. The publication of Read's book had a long-lasting impact on the productivity and scholarship at FEE, leading to a decline of FEE as a center of libertarian productivity and research, as well as an exodus from FEE of all its best talents, led by F.A. Harper.

Rothbard recounts how, in 1953, the libertarian movement gained mainstream recognition after Ralph Lord Roy's book, Apostles of Discord, included a chapter on "God and the 'Libertarians.'" The book, which Rothbard described as part of the "extremist-baiting" genre, was a vituperative attack on various right-wingers, including libertarians, who were placed in the "Ministry of Discord" category. Although Roy's treatment of Spiritual Mobilization, Faith and Freedom, Foundation for Economic Education (FEE), Nock, and Chodorov was accurate, the inclusion of FEE under Protestantism was strained. The chapter also attacked Christian Economics, a bimonthly free-market tabloid edited by Howard E. Kershner. Meanwhile, the term "libertarian" had been captured by proponents of individual liberty, and Frank Chodorov continued to prefer the word "individualist." Chodorov founded the Intercollegiate Society of Individualists in 1953 with the help of a $1,000 donation from J. Howard Pew of Sun Oil and the mailing list of FEE.

Chapter 8, "The Postwar Renaissance II: Politics and Foreign Policy", discusses the political climate in the post-World War II era, with a focus on the extreme right-wing of the Republican Party. This group included politicians who were isolationist and opposed to foreign wars and interventions. They were also advocates of free-market and libertarian policies in domestic affairs. The extreme right also included media outlets such as the Chicago Tribune, which published articles against Wall Street and interventionist policies. Senator Taft was a leading figure of the right-wing Republicans, but his tendency to compromise on issues often led to criticism from other conservatives. The extreme right-wing opposed conscription and militarism, seeing them as forms of state control. However, the rise of renegade isolationists like Arthur Vandenberg and the nomination of Tom Dewey for president, who represented Eastern Wall Street internationalists, dealt a blow to the Old Right cause in the Republican Party. Rothbard himself identified with the right-wing Republicans and supported their views.

Rothbard describes Senator Robert Taft's opposition to the Truman administration's foreign policy. Taft was isolationist and anti-interventionist, which put him at odds with many in his party and the Democrats who believed in containment and the Cold War. He opposed the Marshall Plan, NATO, and US involvement in Asia. He was particularly courageous in refusing to support Cold War measures in response to the "coup" in Czechoslovakia in 1948, in which rightists resigned, leaving a leftist government in power. Taft believed that the Soviet Union did not plan to initiate aggression or conquer additional territory. He warned that NATO violated the spirit of the UN Charter and that it would inevitably lead to an armament race and war. The antiwar isolationism of the Old Right was defeated during the Korean War. Even the Old Left, except for the Communist Party and I.F. Stone, supported Truman's aggression in the war. Howard Buffett, an extreme right-wing Republican, opposed the war, and I.F. Stone commended him for his leadership. The chapter concludes that it was unfortunate that Buffett did not follow up on Stone's feeler to establish a Left-Right alliance.

Rothbard discusses the political situation in early 1951 when isolationist forces led by Senators Wherry and Taft attacked Truman's refusal to accept a ceasefire or peace in Korea. Wherry and Taft submitted a resolution prohibiting the President from sending any troops abroad without prior approval of Congress. McGeorge Bundy criticized Taft's foreign policy, stating that negotiations rather than military interventions would not assert America's global leadership against communism. Herbert Hoover and Joseph P. Kennedy, both well-known isolationist elder statesmen, delivered speeches in December 1950 calling for American evacuation of Korea and an end to the war in Asia. Kennedy concluded that the only alternative was for America to abandon the entire policy of global intervention and adopt isolationism once more.

Rothbard discusses the reactions of the organized liberalism to the Kennedy-Hoover thesis. Hoover, in a speech, refused to go as far as Kennedy but insisted that committing ground forces against the communist land mass would be a war without victory. Organized liberalism, such as the Nation and the New Republic, red-baited these right-wing leaders and charged them with isolationism. The New Republic was particularly critical of the isolationists who condemned US participation in Korea as unconstitutional. One of the people that the New Republic referred to as part of the "Stalinist caucus" at the Chicago Tribune was George Morgenstern, an editorial writer for the Tribune and author of a revisionist work on Pearl Harbor. During the Korean War, Morgenstern wrote an article in the Washington weekly Human Events, which summed up the century of American imperialism, arguing that the burden of proof rests with those who contend that America is better off, that American security has been enhanced, and that prospects of world peace have been improved by American intervention in four wars in half a century.

Chapter 9, "The Postwar Renaissance III: Libertarians and Foreign Policy", discusses the post-war renaissance of libertarianism and foreign policy in America. The chapter analyzes a pamphlet written by conservative and free-market publicist Garet Garrett in 1952 titled The Rise of Empire. In the pamphlet, Garrett claims that America has shifted from a constitutional republic to an empire. He argues that the hallmarks of Empire are that the executive power of government must be dominant and that domestic policy becomes subordinate to foreign policy. He warns that American domestic policy, including individual freedom and private property, may be sacrificed to the necessities of foreign policy.

Rothbard discusses the opposition to the Korean War and militarism by the libertarian wing of the Old Right movement. Leonard Read published a pamphlet called Conscience on the Battlefield in which he argued that war was an enemy of liberty and economic progress. Similarly, F.A. Harper wrote in In Search of Peace that war does not level the attack on the real enemy, which is the idea of slavery, and that war advocates are enemies of freedom. The Russians were seen as a threat only because of fear of US intentions or retaliation to US acts. The Old Right believed that the nation should not go to war unless it was under direct attack, as collective arrangements such as the government or the army could not bear the guilt of taking human lives. The real enemy was not communism or any other foreign ideology, but rather the use of coercion and violence by the state to achieve its objectives.

Chapter 10, "The Postwar Renaissance IV: Swansong of the Old Right", describes the Old Right of the postwar period as opponents of war and militarism who also championed a laissez-faire approach to domestic affairs. The National Association of Manufacturers (NAM) took a laissez-faire line and was small-business oriented, but the Big Business liberals eventually defeated the laissez-fairists in a dramatic battle in 1947. The Taft-Hartley Act completed the Wagner Act process of bringing the new union movement into a cozy partnership with Big Business and Big Government. The Old Right specialized in anti-Establishment muckraking, with the Chicago Tribune being a leading example. The Tribune wrote a series of articles about the Rhodes Scholar Anglophile influence in the foreign policymaking bodies of the U.S. government. The Reece Committee attacked large foundations, including Rockefeller, Carnegie, and Ford, for sponsoring empirical and quantitatively oriented studies in the social sciences that promoted technocracy and value-freedom to the neglect of the qualitative and the ethical.

Rothbard discusses the failure of the Reece Committee's attempt to hold private foundations accountable for advocating government control over private organizations. This failure was due to the conservatives and quasi-libertarians on the committee wielding the coercive arm of the government to harass private foundations. Rothbard argues that the committee ended up advocating for government restrictions on the private foundations, which launched the modern trend toward ever-tighter regulation of foundations but did not change their ideological or methodological drift. The chapter also discusses the defeat of Senator Taft by Eisenhower in the Wall Street capture of the 1952 presidential nomination, which marked the passing of the old isolationist Right. Rothbard argues that the later, 1960s Republican right wing, the Goldwater-Buckley Right, had no connection with the old Taft Right, even organizationally.

Chapters about the decline of the "Old Right" and the rise of the "New Right" in the 1950s 
Chapter 11, "Decline of the Old Right", describes the decline of the old right in the US. As the Eisenhower foreign policy began to take on a frozen Dullesian lineament of permanent mass armament and the threat of massive nuclear retaliation, isolationist sentiment started to fade away even among old libertarian and isolationist compatriots who should have known better. The author noticed that young libertarians coming into the ranks were increasingly infected with the Cold War mentality and had never even heard of the isolationist alternative. Novelist Louis Bromfield’s non-fiction work of 1954, A New Pattern for a Tired World, was a "hard-hitting" tract on behalf of free-market capitalism and a peaceful foreign policy but had almost no impact on the right wing of the day. Bromfield criticized the American foreign policy of the time, which he claimed identified the US with the old, doomed and rotting colonial-imperialist small European nations, and argued that the US could not appear to the awakening peoples of Asia in the role of friend and benefactor while financing, attempting to restore to power, and providing arms to the very forces of the dying colonial empires against which they were in rebellion. In Bromfield's view, the whole of US foreign policy was not worth the torture or life of one unwilling conscript and was the most dangerous and destructive of policies to the peace and welfare of the world.

Rothbard discusses his contributions to the issue of peaceful foreign policy and his opposition to the Cold War and militarism. He red-baits and criticizes William Henry Chamberlin, who shifts his principles between supporting free-market economics and statism, and denounces present-day isolationists and opponents of the Cold War as "appeasers" and proponents of "another Munich." Rothbard also writes about his articles and columns, which call for peaceful coexistence, joint disarmament, withdrawal from NATO and the UN, recognition of Communist China, as well as free trade with all countries. He debates fellow columnist William S. Schlamm on whether or not to fight for Formosa, which results in a clash between their different worldviews. Overall, Rothbard critiques the growing adherence to militarism and the Cold War on the right wing and expresses his hopes for neutralism and isolationism.

Rothbard describes how the libertarian voice of Frank Chodorov was silenced after he was ousted as editor of the Freeman. After Chodorov's departure, the Freeman lost its libertarian stance and became increasingly conservative. Additionally, the article discusses the split between the owners of Human Events magazine, which resulted in the magazine becoming more interventionist. The chapter ends by mentioning some isolated instances where isolationism continued to be supported by some right-wing groups.

Rothbard describes the ordeal of the Bricker Amendment, a major foreign-policy plan of conservative Republicans in the 1950s designed to prevent international treaties and executive agreements from overriding previous internal law or provisions of the Constitution. The Amendment was supported by various right-wing groups, but opposed by the Eisenhower administration and organized liberal groups. The Amendment was defeated in a Senate vote in February 1954, and it disappeared from right-wing councils afterwards. The third-party ticket of 1956 was the last direct political embodiment of the Old Right, as attempts by disgruntled Old Rightists to launch a third party were unsuccessful due to lack of organization, money, and political support.

Rothbard talks about his involvement with two third-party attempts in New York – the Constitution Party and the Independent Party, and their eventual failures. He also discusses the presidential candidates he supported in the 1956 election, Bracken Lee and T. Coleman Andrews. He mentions his preference for Adlai Stevenson, largely due to his pro-peace stance. Later, Rothbard was dismissed as the Washington columnist for Faith and Freedom due to accusations of being a "Communist." Rothbard also reflects on the decline of the libertarian wing of the Old Right in the 1950s and how the Spiritual Mobilization group turned towards mystical influences rather than providing leadership in difficult times.

Chapter 12, "National Review and the Triumph of the New Right", discusses the rise of the New Right and how they successfully used anti-Communist sentiment to advance their cause. He explains how the simplistic view of the political spectrum, with Communism on the left and libertarianism on the right, caused the Old Right to consider conservatives their natural allies and blur the lines between liberals and Communists. However, Rothbard argues that this view was misguided and that the development of Liberalism represented a reversion to the old despotic ancien régime that had been the enemy of economic freedom and individual liberty. He also notes that the ex-Communist and ex-leftist intellectuals played a significant role in promoting anti-Communist sentiment during this period.

Rothbard explains that Senator McCarthy was responsible for changing the right-wing's mass base from isolationism and quasi-libertarianism to simple anti-communism. Although the liberals initiated red-baiting and anti-communist witch-hunting, McCarthy learned it from the Social Democratic figure Norman Thomas. McCarthy's crusade attracted urban Catholics from the Eastern seaboard, ex-Communists, and ex-leftists, and transformed the base of the right-wing movement. The author admits being a McCarthy enthusiast and cheering for him because he was attacking government officials. The film "Point of Order" also shows McCarthy's impeccable logic when he pointed out the "international Communist conspiracy." Finally, the author agrees with Steinke and Weinstein's assertion that McCarthy did not invent witch-hunting and red-baiting; he simply carried it to its logical conclusion, taking the liberals' own creation.

Rothbard describes his participation in the Circle Bastiat and the Students for America. During the height of the McCarthy era, he gave a speech that was applauded at a testimonial dinner for Roy Cohn, which asked why there was so much hatred for Cohn and McCarthy from liberal intellectuals. It concluded with a populist appeal to the American people to take back their government from the criminal alliance of Communists, Socialists, New Dealers, and Eisenhower-Dewey Republicans. The speech gained considerable notoriety and was criticized as a rightist version of the Progressive Party convention of '1948. The author was bewildered by McCarthy's turn towards pushing for war against Communism abroad after his censure by the Senate. The author believes that a major force for this turn was Alfred Kohlberg, a major backer of McCarthy. Finally, the author concludes that the lack of an organization was the reason for the McCarthy movement's short-run collapse, which was remedied by William F. Buckley and the newly formed weekly National Review.

Rothbard discusses the founding of National Review in 1955, which was aimed at directing the newly transformed right-wing. The magazine was a coalition of ex-Communist journalists, intellectuals, and younger Catholics whose major goal was anti-Communism. The interest in individual liberty was minimal or negative, and free-market economics was mostly confined to occasional pieces by Henry Hazlitt. The author questions whether the entire effort was a CIA operation, given that Bill Buckley and his sister Priscilla were CIA agents, and other editors had been recipients of CIA largesse. It was also a standard practice in the CIA that no one ever resigned from the CIA. The case for National Review being a CIA operation becomes even stronger when considering that a character even more sinister than E. Howard Hunt, William J. Casey, appears at key moments in the establishment of the New Right.

According to Rothbard, the emergence of Russell Kirk as the leader of the New Conservatism, with the publication of his book The Conservative Mind in 1953, was an important force in transforming the American right-wing, especially in vitiating its "domestic" libertarianism and even its rhetorical devotion to individual liberty. Kirk, who was far more acceptable to "vital center" corporate liberalism than was the Old Right, was quite close to the Conservatism of Peter Viereck, who believed that Big Government and domestic statism were perfectly acceptable provided that they were steeped in some sort of Burkean tradition and enjoyed a Christian framework. Kirk brought the words "Conservatism" and "New Conservatism" into general acceptance on the right-wing. The Kirkian influence was soon evident in right-wing youth meetings, and he also succeeded in altering the historical pantheon of heroes, replacing rationalists, atheists, and anarchists with reactionaries and antilibertarians. With its formidable array of anti-Communists and Catholic traditionalists, National Review quickly took over the lead and direction of the New Right, which it rapidly remolded in its own image. The "official" line of National Review was "fusionist", whose leading practitioners were Meyer and Buckley; "fusionism" stressed the dominance of anti-Communism and Christian order, but retained some libertarian rhetoric in a subordinate rank. The transformation of the right-wing could not have taken place without "fusionism," and many of the other National Review intellectuals were impatient with any concessions to liberty.

Rothbard discusses the political strategists behind the conservative movement, particularly National Review, in the late 1950s and early 1960s. James Burnham was the magazine's leading power and global anti-Communist strategist who had only shown one fleeting bit of positive interest in individual liberty. Bill Rusher, the magazine's publisher, was a brilliant political organizer who took over control of the College Young Republicans and then the National Young Republican Federation. Rusher headed a group called the "Syndicate" and controlled the national Young Republicans since 1959. In 1959, National Review organized the founding of the Young Americans for Freedom, which became the collegiate youth-activist arm of the National Review political complex. Rothbard found the New Right's drastic shift to all-out and pervasive war-mongering hardest to swallow. He realized that what the New Rightists of National Review wanted was total war against the Soviet Union.

Chapters about the 1960s and Rothbard's experience in the New Left 
Chapter 13, "The Early 1960s: From Right to Left", talks about Rothbard's break with the National Review and the right wing in the early 1960s. Rothbard enthusiastically favored Khrushchev's visit to the United States in 1959, which was a sign of a possible détente and peaceful coexistence. However, the National Review became hysterical at the possibility and tried to whip up public sentiment to disrupt the visit. The right-wing opposition continued in early 1960 with the summit conference, which Rothbard hoped would build on the good will of the preceding Khrushchev visit. Rothbard became more isolated from the right wing, and he finally broke with the right with the Stevenson movement of 1960. He shifted from a right-wing Republican to a left-wing Democrat, and the crucial issue for him became peace or war. The only viable political movement for him was the left-wing of the Democratic Party. Rothbard became a leader in a new political organization, the League of Stevensonian Democrats (LSD), and took a stand firmly for Kennedy against Richard Nixon. Rothbard continued to advance libertarianism and even wore his extreme right-wing hat while urging genuine conservatives not to vote for Richard Nixon in a letter published in the Wall Street Journal.

Rothbard recounts how the author and his colleague, Leonard Liggio, re-examined their beliefs and realized that their former isolationism had accepted the myth of the Russian "threat" and that the US was responsible for the Cold War. They believed that the Soviet Union had only wanted national security and the absence of anti-Soviet regimes on its borders. In contrast, the US was the threat to world peace and liberty. They became "left-wing Democrats" on foreign policy and sought an isolationist movement that did not favor the US over the Soviet Union.

William Appleman Williams and his students, especially Gabriel Kolko, changed Rothbard's and Liggio's view of American history and the American system. As they learned, Big Business is not a persecuted minority, as some on the Right claim, but is actually responsible for creating federal regulations and welfare statism to shift from a free market to a cartelized economy. He also argues that liberal intellectuals serve as "corporate liberals," justifying the rule of the American corporate state on behalf of the "common good" and "general welfare," much like priests in Oriental despotisms convinced the masses of the divinity of their emperor. Lastly, Rothbard argues that the revolutions in the Third World were not only for national independence but also against feudal land monopolists in support of just ownership by the oppressed peasantry. He believes that genuine believers in justice and private property should favor the expropriation of stolen and conquered lands by the peasants, but unfortunately, only the Communists supported the peasant movements. Rothbard and Leonard Liggio's goal was to advance the libertarian, anarcho-capitalist movement and to convert libertarians to their newfound anti-imperialist and "left-right" perspective.

Rothbard mentions Robert LeFevre's Freedom School as a beacon of hope for the movement, and talks about how he was able to rebuild a small circle in New York dedicated to the "left-right" analysis. Rothbard describes a winter-and-spring long "Phrontistery" organized by LeFevre to pave the way for transforming Freedom School into a Rampart College. He also discusses his growing concern with the New Right's war drive and his efforts to warn the public about the menace of nuclear war that Goldwaterism presented. Finally, he talks about his attempt to recall conservative and libertarian votes from Goldwater by reminding them of their long-forgotten libertarian heritage, but he failed to convince them.

Chapter 14, "The Later 1960s: The New Left", talks about how he and Leonard Liggio found an ally in the New Left movement that emerged in the US in the mid-1960s. This movement included the Berkeley Free Speech Movement and the Students for a Democratic Society's march in Washington, both of which protested the Vietnam War. Rothbard was pleased that the New Left was not a namby-pamby peace group and was an anti-war movement that welcomed all Americans willing to join in the struggle against the war. Rothbard notes that the SDS, the leader of the antiwar movement, was a quasi-libertarian group that had a vague enough ideology to encompass even right-wing libertarians. SDS was breaking away from its parent organization, the League for Industrial Democracy, which represented the worst of Old Left liberalism. Rothbard founded Left and Right, a journal, to influence libertarians throughout the country to break with the right wing and to ally themselves with the emerging New Left and push that left further in a libertarian direction.

Rothbard describes his participation in the Peace and Freedom Party (PFP) during the 1968 campaign. The PFP was a coalition party established in California that had opened up in New York. It was structured around clubs, and one of them was the Faculty Club, which was entitled to two delegates. About half of the members were libertarians. The PFP and its executive committee were being run by the Leninist-Trotskyite Draperites, and the opposition within PFP was being run by the Maoist Progressive Labor Party (PL). The alliance between PL and the author's libertarian group was highly useful to both sides in fending off Draperite dictatorship in the name of democracy. What the author's group got out of it was PL's firm support for an ideological platform that was probably the most libertarian of any party since the days of Cleveland Democracy. The author's fondest memories of life in the PFP were of Jake Rosen trying to justify their laissez-faire platform to his Maoist dunderheads.

Finally, Rothbard reflects on the downfall of the New Left in the late 1960s, which abandoned its promise of libertarianism and became radicalized, violent, and anti-intellectual. He believes that libertarians who had aligned themselves with the New Left lost their commitment to individualism, private property rights, and free-market economics. He argues that libertarians should create a self-conscious movement and maintain and extend their libertarian cadre to make strong and fruitful alliances without endangering the libertarian movement itself. Meanwhile, the Buckleyite right wing was abandoning its rhetorical devotion to libertarian ideals and purging extremist elements in favor of respectability and power. Rothbard also mentions the rewarding of Bill Buckley with a post as a member of the Advisory Commission of the US Information Agency, our Ministry of Propaganda overseas, and the criticism he received for joining the Establishment.

References

External links

Full text
 Download text (PDF) at Ludwig von Mises Institute
 Download (EPUB) at Ludwig von Mises Institute
 Download (PDF) at Google Books
 Read online at Google Books

Full audio
 Download (ZIP) at Ludwig von Mises Institute
 Listen online at SoundCloud
 Listen online at Apple Podcasts
 Listen online at Google Podcasts

2007 non-fiction books
American political books
Books about neoconservatism
Books by Murray Rothbard
Books published posthumously
Criticism of neoconservatism
English-language books
History books about the United States
Non-interventionism
Old Right (United States)
Paleoconservative publications